The women's 100 metre butterfly event at the 2016 Summer Olympics took place on 6–7 August at the Olympic Aquatics Stadium.

Summary
Swedish swimmer Sarah Sjöström overturned her own existing world record to become the country's first Olympic champion in the pool since Lars Frölander topped the podium on the male counterpart of this event in 2000. She maintained an enormous lead from the start to capture her first Olympic gold medal with a 55.48, shaving 0.16 seconds off from her own world record. Canada's 16-year-old Penny Oleksiak came from third at the initial length to smash a new junior World and Canadian record for the silver in 56.46, touching out U.S. swimmer and reigning Olympic titleholder Dana Vollmer, who claimed the bronze in 56.63, by just 0.17 of a second.

Chinese teammates Chen Xinyi (56.72) and London 2012 runner-up Lu Ying (56.76) picked up the fourth and fifth spots respectively, separated by 0.04-second margin. Meanwhile, teenager Rikako Ikee cracked a 57-second barrier with a Japanese record and a sixth-place finish in 56.86. Australia's Emma McKeon (57.05) and Denmark's four-time Olympian Jeanette Ottesen (57.17) rounded out the championship field. In December 2016, Chen Xinyi was disqualified after failing a drugs test.

Earlier in the semifinals, Sjöström established a new Olympic record time of 55.84 to take the top seed for a historic finale, slicing 0.14 seconds off from the standard held by Vollmer at the previous Games.

The medals for the competition were presented by Gunilla Lindberg, Sweden, IOC member, and the gifts were presented by Mr. Pipat Paniangvait, Honorary Treasurer of the FINA.

Records
Prior to this competition, the existing world and Olympic records were as follows.
			

The following records were established during the competition:

Competition format

The competition consisted of three rounds: heats, semifinals, and a final. The swimmers with the best 16 times in the heats advanced to the semifinals. The swimmers with the best 8 times in the semifinals advanced to the final. Swim-offs were used as necessary to break ties for advancement to the next round.

Results

Heats

Semifinals

Semifinal 1

Semifinal 2

Final

 - On 10 December 2016, FINA confirmed that Chen, who had originally placed 4th, tested positive for unlawful substances at the Games. Her results were voided, and she was given a two year ban from competing.

References

Women's 00100 metre butterfly
Olympics
2016 in women's swimming
Women's events at the 2016 Summer Olympics